The Marriage Market is a 1917 American silent drama film directed by Arthur Ashley and starring Carlyle Blackwell, June Elvidge and Arthur Ashley.

Cast
 June Elvidge as Helen Grant
 Arthur Ashley as Bradley Spayden
 Carlyle Blackwell as Richard Marlowe
 Frederick Truesdell as Eric Foxhall
 Jack Drumier as John Grant
 Charles Duncan as Mr. Beale
 Eugenie Woodward as Mrs. Marlowe
 Lewis Edgard as Grimes

References

Bibliography
 Langman, Larry. American Film Cycles: The Silent Era. Greenwood Publishing, 1998.

External links
 

1917 films
1917 drama films
1910s English-language films
American silent feature films
Silent American drama films
Films directed by Arthur Ashley
American black-and-white films
World Film Company films
1910s American films